Lom may be:
Lomavren, the language of the Lom people of Armenia
the Lom dialect of Bangka Malay